The Fulen (2,490 m) is a mountain peak of the Schwyz Alps, located on the border between the Swiss cantons of Schwyz and Uri. It lies on the range between Muotathal and Unterschächen, east of Lake Lucerne.

References

External links
 Fulen on Hikr

Mountains of Switzerland
Mountains of the Alps
Mountains of the canton of Schwyz
Mountains of the canton of Uri